Cultural events were held at the 2009 Jeux de la Francophonie between 27 September and 4 October. There were seven cultural competitions: song, storytelling, traditional inspiration dance, poetry, painting, photography and sculpture.

Calendar

Medallists

Medal table

References
General
Livre des Résultats. Jeux de la Francophonie (2009). Retrieved on 2009-10-09.
Specific

External links
Official results

2009 Jeux de la Francophonie
Cultural events at the Jeux de la Francophonie